Aluetelevisio (ATV) was a Finnish cable television channel which operated from the end of the 1990s to the start of the 2000s. ATV was owned by Christian Moustgaard. His son Eetu Moustgaard worked at ATV as a reporter.

The channel was known in Helsinki for its (then) revolutionary approach to urban journalism and TV entertainment in general. The production team had no  previous experience in TV work and the channel basically "made it up as they went along". In a way the programs looked much like the reality-TV shows  that the modern day television is packed with. But as the term Reality-TV did not yet exist, ATV was heavily criticised for its amateurish look and at times challenging views as being unprofessional and childish. Mostly it seems, though, that the channel's utter lack of resemblance with conventional television and its immediacy in regard to the surrounding urban landscape was welcomed by the majority of viewers.
  
In an attempt to attract attention and to accumulate much-sought revenues from related SMS-services, ATV soon after its launch took to showing pornography without charge during nighttime.

1999 establishments in Finland
2002 disestablishments in Finland
Defunct television channels in Finland
Television channels and stations established in 1999
Television channels and stations disestablished in 2002
Mass media in Helsinki